The 2019 election to Belfast City Council, part of the Northern Ireland local elections on 2 May 2019,  returned 60 members to the council via Single Transferable Vote.

Election results

Note: "Votes" are the first preference votes.

Districts summary

|- class="unsortable" align="centre"
!rowspan=2 align="left"|Ward
! % 
!Cllrs
! %
!Cllrs
! %
!Cllrs
! %
!Cllrs
! %
!Cllrs
! %
!Cllrs
! % 
!Cllrs
! % 
!Cllrs
! % 
!Cllrs
!rowspan=2|TotalCllrs
|- class="unsortable" align="center"
!colspan=2 bgcolor="" | Sinn Féin
!colspan=2 bgcolor="" | DUP
!colspan=2 bgcolor="" | Alliance
!colspan=2 bgcolor=""| SDLP
!colspan=2 bgcolor="" | Green
!colspan=2 bgcolor="" | PBP
!colspan=2 bgcolor="" | UUP
!colspan=2 bgcolor="" | PUP
!colspan=2 bgcolor="white"| Others
|-
|align="left"|Balmoral
|13.9
|1
|bgcolor="#D46A4C"|26.8
|bgcolor="#D46A4C"|2
|20.0
|1
|23.0
|1
|5.5
|0
|2.2
|0
|7.2
|0
|0.0
|0
|1.4
|0
|5
|-
|align="left"|Black Mountain
|bgcolor="#008800"|68.8
|bgcolor="#008800"|6
|0.0
|0
|1.5
|0
|5.6
|0
|1.5
|0
|16.1
|1
|0.0
|0
|0.0
|0
|6.5
|0
|7
|-
|align="left"|Botanic
|16.0
|1
|bgcolor="#D46A4C"|20.3
|bgcolor="#D46A4C"|1
|19.5
|1
|10.4
|1
|14.4
|1
|3.9
|0
|3.3
|0
|1.7
|0
|10.4
|0
|5
|-
|align="left"|Castle
|24.4
|1
|bgcolor="#D46A4C"|25.2
|bgcolor="#D46A4C"|2
|15.8
|1
|10.6
|1
|7.8
|1
|1.8
|0
|9.0
|0
|0.0
|0
|5.4
|0
|6
|-
|align="left"|Collin
|bgcolor="#008800"|63.3
|bgcolor="#008800"|4
|2.6
|0
|3.7
|0
|8.0
|1
|2.0
|0
|12.9
|1
|1.1
|0
|0.0
|0
|6.4
|0
|6
|-
|align="left"|Court
|25.1
|2
|bgcolor="#D46A4C"|44.2
|bgcolor="#D46A4C"|3
|2.2
|0
|2.6
|0
|1.3
|0
|6.1
|0
|3.4
|0
|8.2
|1
|6.9
|0
|6
|-
|align="left"|Lisnasharragh
|5.6
|0
|27.9
|2
|bgcolor="#F6CB2F"|28.8
|bgcolor="#F6CB2F"|2
|8.9
|1
|11.1
|1
|1.2
|0
|8.3
|0
|3.3
|0
|4.7
|0
|6
|-
|align="left"|Oldpark
|bgcolor="#008800"|37.3
|bgcolor="#008800"|3
|20.1
|1
|3.4
|0
|25.2
|1
|2.0
|0
|3.9
|1
|2.1
|0
|5.1
|0
|0.8
|0
|6
|-
|align="left"|Ormiston
|0.4
|0
|27.0
|2
|bgcolor="#F6CB2F"|41.8
|bgcolor="#F6CB2F"|3
|0.0
|0
|9.8
|1
|0.0
|0
|16.4
|1
|3.0
|0
|1.7
|0
|7
|-
|align="left"|Titanic
|11.6
|0
|bgcolor="#D46A4C"|29.2
|bgcolor="#D46A4C"|2
|22.4
|2
|0.0
|0
|6.8
|0
|0.0
|0
|11.9
|1
|10.8
|1
|7.1
|0
|6
|- class="unsortable" class="sortbottom" style="background:#C9C9C9"
|align="left"| Total
|28.2
|18
|21.5
|15
|15.7
|10
|9.1
|6
|6.0
|4
|5.2
|3
|6.2
|2
|3.1
|2
|5.1
|0
|60
|-
|}

Incumbent candidates are indicated by an asterisk *

District results

Balmoral

2014: 1 x DUP, 1 x SDLP, 1 x Alliance, 1 x Sinn Féin, 1 x UUP
2019: 2 x DUP, 1 x SDLP, 1 x Alliance, 1 x Sinn Féin
2014-2019 Change: DUP gain from UUP

Black Mountain

2014: 5 x Sinn Féin, 1 x People Before Profit, 1 x SDLP
2019: 6 x Sinn Féin, 1 x People Before Profit
2014-2019 Change: Sinn Féin gain from SDLP

Botanic

2014: 1 x DUP, 1 x Alliance, 1 x Sinn Féin, 1 x SDLP, 1 x UUP
2019: 1 x DUP, 1 x Alliance, 1 x Sinn Féin, 1 x SDLP, 1 x Green
2014-2019 Change: Green gain from UUP

Castle

2014: 2 x DUP, 1 x Sinn Féin, 1 x Alliance, 1 x SDLP, 1 x UUP
2019: 2 x DUP, 1 x Sinn Féin, 1 x Alliance, 1 x SDLP, 1 x Green
2014-2019 Change: Green gain from UUP

Collin

2014: 5 x Sinn Féin, 1 x SDLP
2019: 4 x Sinn Féin, 1 x SDLP, 1 x People Before Profit
2014-2019 Change: People Before Profit gain from Sinn Féin

Court

2014: 2 x DUP, 2 x Sinn Féin, 1 x PUP, 1 x TUV
2019: 3 x DUP, 2 x Sinn Féin, 1 x PUP
2014-2019 Change: DUP gain from TUV

Lisnasharragh

2014: 2 x Alliance, 2 x DUP, 1 x SDLP, 1 x UUP
2019: 2 x Alliance, 2 x DUP, 1 x SDLP, 1 x Green
2014-2019 Change: Green gain from UUP

Oldpark

2014: 3 x Sinn Féin, 1 x SDLP, 1 x DUP, 1 x PUP
2019: 3 x Sinn Féin, 1 x SDLP, 1 x DUP, 1 x People Before Profit
2014-2019 Change: People Before Profit gain from PUP

Ormiston
2014: 2 x Alliance, 2 x DUP, 2 x UUP, 1 x Green
2019: 3 x Alliance, 2 x DUP, 1 x UUP, 1 x Green
2014-2019 Change: Alliance gain from UUP

Titanic

2014: 2 x DUP, 1 x Alliance, 1 x UUP, 1 x PUP, 1 x Sinn Féin
2019: 2 x DUP, 2 x Alliance, 1 x UUP, 1 x PUP
2014-2019 Change: Alliance gain from Sinn Féin

Changes during the term

† Co-options

‡ Changes in affiliation

– Suspensions
None

Last update 6 January 2023.

Current composition: see Belfast City Council.

References
Footnotes

Citations

2019
2019 Northern Ireland local elections
21st century in Belfast
2019 elections in Northern Ireland